Younes Hussein Al Shibani  (born June 27, 1981) is a Libyan footballer who plays as a defender for the Egyptian Premier League side Ismaily. He is a member of the Libya national team.

Club career
For the 2012/13 season, he plays for Ismaily, club from Egypt.

International career
Younes debuted for Libya in 2003, and still plays for national team.

References

External links

 Player profile with photo – Sporting-heroes.net
Player profile – MTN Africa Cup of Nations 2006

1981 births
Living people
Libyan footballers
Libyan expatriate footballers
Libya international footballers
Association football defenders
Al-Ittihad Club (Tripoli) players
Expatriate footballers in Morocco
Expatriate footballers in Egypt
Libyan expatriate sportspeople in Morocco
Libyan expatriate sportspeople in Egypt
2006 Africa Cup of Nations players
2012 Africa Cup of Nations players
Asswehly S.C. players
Olympique Club de Khouribga players
Olympic Azzaweya SC players
Libyan Premier League players